Data onboarding is the process of transferring offline data to an online environment for marketing needs. Data onboarding is mainly used to connect offline customer records with online users by matching identifying information gathered from offline datasets to retrieve the same customers in an online audience.

Process
The onboarding process involves ingesting, anonymizing, matching and distributing a customer's data. Offline data used in onboarding efforts include information such as customer names, email addresses, physical addresses and phone numbers as well as CRM and sales transaction data. Part of the data onboarding process is anonymizing personally identifiable information to protect consumer privacy. Another key step involves matching offline data to online devices, such as a desktop browser cookie or mobile device ID. Offline data like a customer's email address or postal address can also be used as an identifier to match to digital ID's, such as a Facebook or Twitter account. Matched data is finally delivered to a technology platform for use in programmatic marketing.

Data onboarding is primarily used to reach a company's customers with more relevant marketing messages. Companies can also use onboarded data to assess the effectiveness of a marketing campaign or the purchasing trends of their customers. Overall, the process allows data-driven marketers to optimize the impact of online campaigns.

Application
The data onboarding industry consists of marketing technology companies like  LiveRamp, FullContact, Semcasting, Datalogix (now part of Oracle Data Cloud), Throtle, Acho Studio, Neustar, El Toro, Circulate, and TrueData, which develops onboarding services for marketers. Businesses use data onboarding companies to determine whether their ads were seen on digital platforms and if they were effective in driving sales. In 2013, Auren Hoffman, the founder of LiveRamp, estimated that one-third of Fortune 2000 marketers were onboarding data, with most of their clients being from the retail, travel, auto, telecommunications, financial services and publishing industries.

References

Customer relationship management software
Marketing techniques
Data processing